is a Japanese late night variety show starring Japanese idol group Sakurazaka46. It is hosted by Yū Sawabe and Teruyuki Tsuchida and airs every Sunday at 12:35 AM JST on TV Tokyo. It is the direct continuation of Keyakitte, Kakenai?, which had the same cast, format, and time slot, but named after the former name of Sakurazaka46, Keyakizaka46.

History

The idol group Keyakizaka46 was rebranded into Sakurazaka46 on October 14, 2020, and it was announced in the Keyakitte, Kakenai? broadcast on October 11 that the show would also be renewed with a new title. The new show aired on October 19 without the title card in the beginning, and the new title was announced in the middle of the show. The title references the fact that the real Keyakizaka and Sakurazaka streets in Roppongi, Tokyo, are connected.

References

Sakurazaka46
2020 Japanese television series debuts
TV Tokyo original programming
Japanese variety television shows